Bamako is the capital of Mali. 

It could also refer to:

Places
Bamako, Bougouriba, a village in Burkina Faso
Bamako, Comoé, a village in Burkina Faso

Others
Bamako Convention, an African treaty prohibiting the importation of hazardous waste
Bamako Initiative, a formal statement adopted by African health ministers in 1987 in Bamako, Mali
Bamako (film) is a 2006 film directed by Abderrahmane Sissako
Bamako (album) is a 2020 album by Simphiwe Dana

See also
Bomako, a village in Donga Department, Benin
Budapest-Bamako or Great African Run, a charity car race in Africa, and the largest amateur rally in the world
Bamako Sign Language, also known as Malian Sign Language